Zhonglian Township is a rural township in Lengshuijiang, Hunan Province, People's Republic of China.

Administrative division
The township is divided into 18 villages and 2 communities, the following areas: 
 Yangjia Community
 Zhonglian Community
 Batang Village
 Chengyi Village
 Fuyuan Village
 Jinping Village
 Jinwan Village
 Maiyuan Village
 Minzhu Village
 Nangong Village
 Qingyun Village
 Quanqiu Village
 Shengli Village
 Songshan Village
 Tanjia Village
 Yangjia Village
 Yanli Village
 Yuyuan Village
 Yuanda Village
 Zhonglian Village

Attraction
Boyue Cave is a famous scenic spot for karst cave.

References

Divisions of Lengshuijiang